Hoczewka is a right tributary of the San River in southeastern Poland. It flows for 27.8 kilometres, and joins the San near Hoczew.

Rivers of Poland
Rivers of Podkarpackie Voivodeship